The Korail Commuter Diesel Car or CDC for short are commuter diesel multiple units in South Korea. They were introduced in 1996.

References

Bibliography 
 

Diesel multiple units of South Korea
Railway locomotives introduced in 1996
Standard gauge locomotives of South Korea